The 2019 World Allround Speed Skating Championships were held at the Olympic Oval in Calgary, Canada, from 2 –3 March 2019.

Schedule
All times are local (UTC−6).

Medal summary

Medal table

Medalists

References

 
World Allround Speed Skating Championships
World Allround Speed Skating Championships
2019 Allround
World Allround Speed Skating Championships
World Allround
2019 World Allround Speed Skating Championships